Iran competed at the 1968 Summer Olympics in Mexico City, Mexico. 14 athletes represented Iran in the 1968 Olympics.

Competitors

Medal summary

Medal table

Medalists

Results by event

Athletics 

Men

Weightlifting 

Men

Wrestling 

Men's freestyle

Men's Greco-Roman

References

External links
Official Olympic Reports
International Olympic Committee results database
National Olympic Committee of Iran - 1968 Summer Olympics Results for Iran

Nations at the 1968 Summer Olympics
1968
Summer Olympics
Pahlavi Iran